The 2005 K2 League was the third season of the Korea National League. It was divided into two stages, and the winners of each stage qualified for the championship playoff.

Regular season

First stage

Second stage

Championship playoff

Summary

Results

Incheon Korail won 4–2 on aggregate.

See also
2005 in South Korean football
2005 K2 League Championship
2005 Korean FA Cup

References

External links

Korea National League seasons
K